Shreya is an Indian feminine given name. It is a name of Hindu Goddess Lakshmi and it means attributes of Lakshmi- good fortune, beauty and excellence.  Notable people with the name include:
 Shreya Ghoshal (born 1984), Indian playback singer
 Shreya Guhathakurta (born 1975), Indian Rabindra Sangeet singer
 Shreya Narayan (born 1985), Indian actress, model, writer, and social worker
 Shreya Shanker (born 1997), Indian beauty pageant winner
 Shreya Sharma, Indian film actress
 Shreya Singhal, Indian lawyer, known for Shreya Singhal v. Union of India
 Shreya Tripathi (died 2018), Indian health activist

See also 
 Shriya
 Shreyas

Indian feminine given names